Chelakode  is a village in Thrissur district (Thalappilly Taluk) (Kondazhy Panchayath) in the state of Kerala, India.

References

Villages in Thrissur district